Numeralla is a village in Snowy Monaro Region of New South Wales, Australia. In 2016, the population of the village and its surrounding area was 258. The village was known as Umaralla until 1972.

Location 
It is 400 km from Sydney and 23km east of Cooma, the nearest regional town. It is near the confluence of Numeralla River (until 1972 known as the Umaralla River) and Big Badja River. It lies on the road from Cooma to Braidwood.

History

Aboriginal and early settler history 
The area later known as Numeralla lies within the traditional lands of the Ngarigo people. Colonial settlers came into the district in the 1840s. By 1850, the area was part of a large squatter's run called 'Numarella'. Other settlers came as gold miners in the 1850s and 1860s.

It was reported in 1892 that there were just two of the 'Monaro tribe' (Ngarigo) remaining in the Monaro region. It is now believed some Ngarigo people survived colonisation by leaving the district, some merging with clans around Bega and Bermagui.

Gold mining 
Alluvial gold was found on the Numeralla River in 1858 and on the Big Badja river in 1861. In 1866, diggings extended for three miles along the Numeralla River. By 1868, only a few miners remained. Alluvial mining returned to the area between 1892 and 1897, using hydraulic mining.

Village 
The site for a village was gazetted on 16 July 1863. It was proclaimed a village for a second time, in 1885, as a consequence of the Crown Lands Act 1884. Originally named Umaralla, it was renamed Numeralla in 1972.

Numeralla has had a post office since 1863. The village's public school, which opened in 1877, only closed at the end of 2015.

After mining, the rich river flats were used for some years to grow potatoes for the Monaro and Canberra markets.

Present day 
Numeralla is a peaceful village with limited facilities. The village has a public hall (Numeralla Digger's Memorial Hall, also known as Numeralla Hall), a Catholic church (All Saint's), an Anglican church (St John's) and a cemetery to the north of the village.

Folk festival 
The Numeralla Folk Festival usually takes place on the weekend closest to Australia Day each year. It is a free event. The last festival was in 2019, as it was cancelled in 2020–22 due to the Black Summer bushfires and the COVID-19 pandemic in New South Wales.

References

External links section

 Numeralla and District Activities Inc. - The official website of Numeralla NSW Australia

Towns in New South Wales
Snowy Monaro Regional Council
Populated places established in the 1840s
Mining towns in New South Wales